Zinovy Reichstein (born 1961) is a Russian-born American mathematician. He is a professor at the University of British Columbia in Vancouver.
He studies mainly algebra, algebraic geometry and algebraic groups. He introduced (with Joe P. Buhler) the concept of essential dimension.

Early life and education
In high school, Reichstein participated in the national mathematics olympiad in Russia and was the third highest scorer in 1977 and second highest scorer in 1978.

Because of the Antisemitism in the Soviet Union at the time, Reichstein was not accepted to Moscow University, even though he had passed the special math entrance exams. He attended a semester of college at Russian University of Transport instead.

His family then decided to emigrate, arriving in Vienna, Austria, in August 1979 and New York, United States in the fall of 1980. Reichstein worked as a delivery boy for a short period of time in New York. He was then accepted to and attended California Institute of Technology for his undergraduate studies.

Reichstein received his PhD degree in 1988 from Harvard University under the supervision of Michael Artin. Parts of his thesis entitled "The Behavior of Stability under Equivariant Maps" were published in the journal Inventiones Mathematicae.

Career

As of 2011, he is on the editorial board of the mathematics journal Transformation groups.

Awards

Winner of the 2013 Jeffery-Williams Prize awarded by the Canadian Mathematical Society
Fellow of the American Mathematical Society, 2012
Invited Speaker to the International Congress of Mathematicians (Hyderabad, India 2010)

References

External links

Algebraists
Harvard University alumni
20th-century American mathematicians
21st-century American mathematicians
Living people
Academic staff of the University of British Columbia
Place of birth missing (living people)
Fellows of the American Mathematical Society
1961 births